Cappellari is a surname. Notable people with the surname include:

Ciro Cappellari (born 1959), Argentine-German film director, cinematographer, and screenwriter
Daniele Cappellari (born 1976), Italian racing driver